The women's doubles event at the 2010 South American Games was held on 24–27 March.

Medalists

Draw

Finals

Top half

Bottom half

References 
 Draw

Women's Doubles
South